My Father's Place was a music venue in Roslyn, New York. It first opened in 1971, and according to The New York Times, "created a scene that would influence music for decades to come."

In the nearly sixteen years the club was open before it closed in 1987, My Father's Place presented more than 6,000 shows from over 3,000 diverse artists. Its owner Michael "Eppy" Epstein refused to book cover bands, and so the club became known as a place aspiring artists could perform. Young unknown musicians such as Billy Joel, Bruce Springsteen, Madonna, Aerosmith, The Police, Tom Petty, as well as hopeful comics Billy Crystal, Eddie Murphy, and Andy Kaufman, and a host of others graced the stage. In the summer of 2018 Epstein opened a new version of the club in a location not far from the original venue, in the newly renovated Roslyn Hotel (formerly the Roslyn Claremont Hotel).

History

The venue was located on 19 Bryant Avenue in Roslyn and was formerly a car dealership, funeral parlor, bakery and bowling alley named Roslyn Bowl. In the wake of the AMF Bowling boom of the early 1960s, Roslyn Bowl was nearly out of business. To compete, the Roslyn Bowl's owner, Jay Linehan, began booking country music acts to turn the bowling alley into a music venue and promoted the new venture as the largest dance floor on Long Island. At the suggestion of Linehan's son, the Roslyn Bowl changed its name to My Father's Place. That same year, Eppy Epstein (born November 11, 1947) and Richie Hersh (born August 19, 1948) had opened a head shop in Roslyn, Never When, but was not allowed by the village to convert it into a coffee shop. Epstein and Hersh turned to Linehan and offered to book My Father's Place with rock acts. Richie Havens opened the first show at My Father's Place on May 31, 1971, to a sold out audience.

Epstein turned to radio to promote the club and by 1972 had forged a ground-breaking deal with local radio station WLIR to broadcast concerts from the club. Many of these broadcasts have subsequently become highly sought-after bootleg recordings. WLIR, in turn, would become one of the most influential radio stations in the country under its revolutionary program director, Denis McNamara, by creating the format "alternative radio".

Unlike most other clubs that highlighted one genre or one particular era of music, the variety of My Father's Place was possibly its most important trait. The club debuted in America most of reggae's biggest stars, helping to make the genre mainstream. Along with CBGB and Max's Kansas City, My Father's Place was a nurturing ground for young punk and new wave acts like The Runaways, The Ramones, Blondie, The Police, and Talking Heads. Country, bluegrass, and blues artists like Charlie Daniels, Linda Ronstadt, and Stevie Ray Vaughan performed early in their careers, while artists like James Brown, B.B. King, Johnny Winter and Bo Diddley played in the twilight of theirs.

Development pressures led to the village of Roslyn closing down the club on May 3, 1987, with a final performance by the band Tower of Power. WLIR would close later the same year. In 2010 a photo book documenting the history of the club, Fun and Dangerous, was published. In November 2017, Epstein reached an agreement with the 935 Lakshmi Corporation, the new owners of the Roslyn Hotel (formerly the Roslyn Claremont Hotel), to open a new club in their ballroom.

Other locations
There were other venues with the same name:
47-29 Bell Boulevard, Bayside, New York
1221 Old Northern Boulevard, Roslyn, New York

Notable performances

1971
May 30, Richie Havens (venue premiere performance)

1972
February 8, Blue Öyster Cult
May 9–10, Todd Rundgren
June 9–11, Sonny Terry & Brownie McGhee
August 1, Flash
August 6, Glass Harp

1973
April 20, Steeleye Span
May 22–24, Manfred Mann's Earth Band
June 14–17, Freddie King
July 31, Bruce Springsteen & The E-Street Band

1974
January 30 & 31, February 1, Iggy and The Stooges
March 3, If
March 5–6, 10cc
March 9, Rory Gallagher
March 19, Soft Machine
April 14, New York Dolls
April 19, Roger McGuinn
May 16, Fairport Convention featuring Sandy Denny
July 2, Aerosmith
July 21, Linda Ronstadt
August 2 & 20, The Good Rats
September 3, Rory Gallagher
October 28 & 29, Rush

1975
February 2, Steve Goodman
March 26, Ray Manzarek
September 10, Savoy Brown
October 12, Manfred Mann's Earth Band
November 18, Kingfish

1976
January 31, Quicksilver Messenger Service
February 13, Leon Redbone
February 23, Pure Prairie League
March 22, Ramones
May 22, Tommy Bolin
June 28, Toots & the Maytals
August 8, Spirit
August 13 & 14, The Flying Burrito Brothers
August 31, Richie Furay
September 9, Vassar Clements
September 14, Emmylou Harris and the Hot Band
September 27, Ramones & Talking Heads
October 3, John Mayall
November 25, Budgie
November 27 & 28, The Flying Burrito Brothers

1977
January 12 & 13, John Cale
April 13, Ramones
April 23, Tom Petty and the Heartbreakers
June 10, Brand X & John Martyn
July 3, Patti Smith Group
July 15, Peter Rowan
October 10, Tom Waits
November 29, Meat Loaf
December 30, Peter Rowan, Tex Logan, and Vassar Clements

1978
January 5, Stanley Turrentine
February 25, Eddie Money
February 26, NRBQ
March 7, Good Rats
March 10, Robert Hunter
March 16, Hawkwind
March 20, Television
April 7–8, Stuff
April 10, the Barlow Sample Band, Baby!
April 12, Pat Travers
April 13–14, McCoy Tyner
April 18, Richie Furay
April 20, Roy Ayers
May 6, Roy Buchanan
May 10, Talking Heads
May 27 & 28, Robert Hunter and Comfort
June 1, Blondie & Greg Kihn Band
June 9, Television
June 10, Papa John Creach
June 11, Eric Andersen
July 13, John Prine
July 27, John McLaughlin
September 8, Johnny Winter
September 15, David Johansen
September 26, Larry Carlton 
October 13 & 14, Robert Hunter
October 26, Carl Perkins
October 31, Blondie
November 4, Rockpile
November 10, George Thorogood & the Destroyers
November 14, Rory Gallagher Band
November 17 & 18, Captain Beefheart & the Magic Band - released as I'm Going to Do What I Wanna Do: Live at My Father's Place 1978
November 30, Crawler

1979
February 13, The Fabulous Poodles
February 24, Johnny Winter
March 18, Muddy Waters
March 21, Michael Franks
March 29, The Police
April 6, Ramones
May 18, Nektar
June 10, Lou Reed
July 4, Good Rats
July 11, Brewer & Shipley
July 12, Bill Bruford
July 15 & 16, Flo & Eddie
August 9, Robert Hunter
August 22, The Plasmatics
August 23, John Mellencamp
September 2, Buzzcocks
September 7 & 8, Rory Gallagher Band 
September 13, Greg Kihn Band
September 14, Doug Sahm
September 15, David Johansen
September 16, NRBQ
September 17 Gary Burton Quintet, Yusef Lateef
September 20, the Barlow Sample Band, Baby!
September 24, Paul Winter Consort
September 29, Pat Metheny
October 1, Buddy Rich
October 2, The Police
November 4, Iggy Pop
November 23, The Elvin Bishop Group
November 29, National Health
December 13 & 14, Hall & Oates
December 19, 38 Special

1980
January 14, XTC
February 16, John Kay & Steppenwolf
February 17, The Romantics
March 4, Iggy Pop
March 29, Joe Perry Project
April 1, The Fools - released as a radio-station only EP on EMI America as The First Annual Official Unofficial April Fool's Day Live Bootleg
April 2, Squeeze
April 10, Johnny Winter
May 1, The Jeff Lorber Fusion
May 7, Grinderswitch
May 13, Bruce Cockburn
June 24, Small Talk Band a.k.a The Jim Small Band
July 19, Robert Fripp & The League of Gentlemen
August 2, Carolyne Mas
August 19, David Bromberg
November 22, Siouxsie and the Banshees
December 2, XTC
December 3, Captain Beefheart & His Magic Band
December 31, The Good Rats

1981
January 2, Joan Jett and the Blackhearts
February 23, New Riders of the Purple Sage
March 5, Teardrop Explodes
April 11, Carl Wilson
May 8, Dave Mason
May 15, Joe Ely
May 19, David Crosby
June 3, Dixie Dregs
July 4, The Psychedelic Furs
July 26, Bill Nelson
August 7, John Cale
August 25, Missing Persons
September 15, Riot
November 28, The Alvin Lee Band
December 27, The Jim Carroll Band

1982
January 23, B.B. King
February 13, The Waitresses
April 7, The Jim Small Band
April 8, Mike Oldfield
April 10, Anthrax
May 17, Krokus
May 22, Chubby Checker
May 30, Pete Shelley
May 31, Minor Threat / Black Flag
July 1, Riot
July 20, Ramones
September 16, The Lords of the New Church
October 24, The Psychedelic Furs
October 31, Robby Krieger
November 30, The Fixx

1983
January 9, Blue Öyster Cult
January 29, Black Flag
March 18, Steve Vai
May 22, "Weird Al" Yankovic
June 6, Dixie Dregs
June 8, Buddy Rich
September 2, Allan Holdsworth
September 28, The Alarm
October 31, The Jim Small Band

1984
January 6, Jorma Kaukonen
January 14, The Ramones
February 17, Wire Train
April 22, Stevie Ray Vaughan
July 21, Jorma Kaukonen
December 29, The Band

1985
Jorma Kaukonen with band There Goes the Neighborhood

1986
October 31, Ramones
November 1, Hot Tuna
November 7, Robin Trower
November 8, NRBQ
November 21, The Band
November 26, Billy Bragg
November 29, Robert Gordon
December 12, Commander Cody
December 13, Bo Diddley

1987
January 11, Roy Buchanan
February 14, Hot Tuna
May 3, Tower of Power (venue final performance)

See also
Nightclub
The Bottom Line

References

1971 establishments in New York (state)
1987 disestablishments in New York (state)
Former music venues in New York (state)
Buildings and structures in Nassau County, New York